Uchira Vaneswarar Temple is a Hindu temple located in the Mayiladuthurai taluk of Mayiladuthurai district in Tamil Nadu, India.

Deity 
The presiding deity of the temple is Uchira Vaneswarar also called Thurai Kattum Vallalar or Vajravaneswarar, a form of Shiva. The presiding goddess is Veyuru Tholi Ammai.

In popular culture 
The temple has been praised by Saivite poet Thirugnanasambandhar.

References 
 

Shiva temples in Mayiladuthurai district
Padal Petra Stalam